The following is a list of leaders of Nakhchivan Autonomous Republic

Heads of the Nakhichevan ASSR

The leaders of the regional committee of the Communist Party of the Nakhichevan ASSR

The leaders of the higher authorities of the Nakhichevan ASSR

Leaders of the Nakhchivan Autonomous Republic

See also 

 List of leaders of Azerbaijan

External links 
 Nakhchivan Autonomous Republic 
 Executive and administrative bodies of state power of the Nakhchivan ASSR - Nakhchivan Autonomous Republic

Government of Azerbaijan
Azerbaijan history-related lists